Preslik Spur is an ice-free spur lying south of Clemons Spur and Forlidas Ridge in the Dufek Massif, Pensacola Mountains, in Antarctica. It was named by the Advisory Committee on Antarctic Names (US-ACAN), at the suggestion of United States Geological Survey (USGS) party leader Arthur B. Ford, after Private First Class Joseph W. Preslik, a member of the U.S. Army Aviation Detachment with the USGS Pensacola Mountains survey of 1965–66.

Mountains of Queen Elizabeth Land
Pensacola Mountains